Austria competed at the 1984 Summer Olympics in Los Angeles, United States. 102 competitors, 71 men and 31 women, took part in 72 events in 18 sports.

Medalists

Archery

In its third appearance in archery competition at the Olympics, Austria again entered only one competitor.  This time, however, it was the first Austrian woman to compete in Olympic archery.

Women's Individual Competition
 Ursula Valenta — 2395 points (→ 32nd place)

Athletics

Men's Marathon
 Gerhard Hartmann
 Final — did not finish (→ no ranking)

Men's Decathlon
 Georg Werthner
 Final — 8028 points (→ 9th place)

Men's 20 km Walk
 Martin Toporek
 Final — 1:33:58 (→ 29th place)

Men's Hammer Throw 
 Johann Lindner 
 Qualification — 71.28 m (→ did not advance)

Men's Shot Put
 Erwin Weitzl
 Qualifying Round — 18.96 m (→ did not advance)

Boxing

Men's Welterweight (– 67 kg)
Konrad König
 First Round — Bye
 Second Round — Lost to Khemais Refai (Tunisia), RSC-1

Men's Super Heavyweight (+ 91 kg)
Olaf Mayer
 First Round — Lost to Peter Hussing (West Germany), 0:5

Canoeing

Cycling

Nine cyclists, seven men and two women, represented Austria in 1984.

Men's individual road race
 Helmut Wechselberger
 Kurt Zellhofer
 Johann Traxler
 Paul Popp

Team time trial
 Karl Krenauer
 Hans Lienhart
 Peter Muckenhuber
 Helmut Wechselberger

1000m time trial
 Paul Popp

Individual pursuit
 Karl Krenauer

Points race
 Kurt Zellhofer
 Paul Popp

Women's individual road race
 Johanna Hack → 26th place
 Hilde Dobiasch → 38th place

Diving

Equestrianism

Fencing

Eight fencers, all men, represented Austria in 1984.

Men's foil
 Robert Blaschka
 Joachim Wendt
 Georg Somloi

Men's team foil
 Joachim Wendt, Dieter Kotlowski, Georg Somloi, Robert Blaschka, Georg Loisel

Men's épée
 Arno Strohmeyer
 Hannes Lembacher

Men's sabre
 Hanns Brandstätter

Handball

Women's Team Competition
Team Roster
Ulrike Popp
Martina Neubauer 
Susanne Unger
Milena Gschiessl-Foltyn 
Maria Sykora
Sylvia Steinbauer 
Karin Hillinger
Elisabeth Zehetner 
Gabriele Gebauer
Vesna Radovic
Teresa Zielewicz 
Monika Unger

Judo

Modern pentathlon

Three male pentathletes represented Austria in 1984.

Men's Individual Competition:
 Michael Billwein — 4760 points (→ 32nd place)
 Ingo Peirits — 3682 points (→ 51st place)
 Horst Stocker — 3432 points (→ 52nd place)

Men's Team Competition:
 Billwein, Peirits, and Stocker — 11874 points (→ 17th place)

Rowing

Sailing

Men

Open

Shooting

Men

Women

Open

Swimming

Men's 100m Freestyle 
Alexander Pilhatsch
 Heat — 52.25 (→ did not advance, 25th place)

Men's 100m Breaststroke
Thomas Böhm
 Heat — 1:04.60
 B-Final — 1:04.99 (→ 13th place)
Gerhard Prohaska
 Heat — 1:06.41 (→ did not advance, 30th place)

Men's 200m Breaststroke
Thomas Böhm
 Heat — 2:22.17
 B-Final — 2:22.09 (→ 14th place)
Gerhard Prohaska
 Heat — 2:27.85 (→ did not advance, 30th place)

Men's 200m Individual Medley
Alexander Pilhatsch
 Heat — DNS (→ did not advance, no ranking)

Women's 200m Butterfly
Sonja Hausladen
 Heat — 2:13.50
 Final — 2:15.38 (→ 7th place)
Brigitte Wanderer
 Heat — 2:21.16 (→ did not advance, 23rd place)

Women's 200m Individual Medley
Brigitte Wanderer
 Heat — 2:26.85 (→ did not advance, 20th place)

Women's 400m Individual Medley
Sonja Hausladen
 Heat — 4:58.68
 B-Final — 4:57.78 (→ 13th place)
Monika Bayer
 Heat — 5:05.61 (→ did not advance, 17th place)

Synchronized swimming

Weightlifting

Wrestling

References

Nations at the 1984 Summer Olympics
1984
Summer Olympics